Carposina cardinata is a moth in the family Carposinidae. It was described by Edward Meyrick in 1913. It is found in Guyana.

References

Carposinidae
Moths described in 1913
Moths of South America